Matthew Francis (born 20 November 1956 in Hampshire, United Kingdom) is a British poet, editor of W. S. Graham's New Collected Poems, and a professor at the Aberystwyth University. In 2004, Francis was included on the Poetry Book Society's list of the 20 best modern poets as selected by a panel chaired by poet laureate Andrew Motion.

Personal life 
Francis lived in Winchester for many years. He worked for ten years in the computer industry.  After his time spent in the computer industry, he went back to university to study the work of W. S. Graham. Soon after he edited Graham's New Collected Poems and authored a study on Graham called Where the People Are. He now lives in Wales with his wife, Creina, where he lectures in creative writing at the University of Wales, Aberystwyth.

Writing 
Amy Wack of Poetry Wales categorized his writing by saying, "Francis's style is clever ebullient, pacey, often brilliant."  His poem The Ornamental Hermit won him the TLS/Blackwell's Prize 2000. City Autumn won the national Gathering Swallows prize for the best poem by a published poet in response to Keats' To Autumn. His short story collection Singing a Man to Death was shortlisted in the fiction category of the Wales Book of the Year in 2013. In addition to his poetry, Francis also writes on W. S. Graham and Sir John Mandeville

Bibliography 

Wing (Faber & Faber, 2020)
The Mabinogi (Faber & Faber, 2017)
The Book of the Needle (Cinnamon Press, 2014)
Muscovy (Faber & Faber, 2013)
Singing a Man to Death (Cinnamon Press, 2012)
Mandeville (Faber & Faber, 2008)
Whereabouts (Rufus Books, 2005)
Where the People Are (2004)
Dragons (2001)
The Ornamental Hermit (2000)
AMERICAN FUGUE (2000)
City Autumn 
Blizzard (1996)
Whom (1989)

References

External links 
Matthew Francis's website
Whereabouts Review
Staff page for Matthew Francis at Aberystwyth University
Where the People Are 
Blizzard review

1956 births
Academics of Aberystwyth University
Living people